When the Bough Breaks is a 1986 television film directed by Waris Hussein and starring Ted Danson. The screenplay by Phil Penningroth was adapted from Jonathan Kellerman's 1985 novel of the same name. Danson, who also co-produced, plays the crime-solving forensic psychologist Alex Delaware, a character who appears in a series of novels by Kellerman.

Plot 
Alex Delaware, a Los Angeles psychiatrist, testifies for the prosecution in the trial of an accused child molester. Later the defendant, who is out on bail, is found dead in the psychiatrist's office, in what appears to be a suicide. Shaken, the psychiatrist moves to the mountains outside of L.A. Not long afterwards a detective he knows, Milo Sturgis, comes to him for help. A seven-year-old girl saw someone kill both of her parents, but is so traumatized by the event that she can't remember anything, and Sturgis wants the doctor to help: Alex agrees, and the two go on the trail of the real perpetrators.

Cast 
 Ted Danson as Alex Delaware
 Richard Masur as Milo Sturgis
 Rachel Ticotin as Raquel Santos
 James Noble as Dr. Warren Towle
 Kim Miyori as Kim Hickle
 Merritt Butrick as Tim Kruger
 David Huddleston as Vicar McCaffey
 Charles Lane as Van der Graaf
 Scott Paulin as Rick
 Deborah Harmon as Lisa

Reception
A 1986 New York Times review said that, after a "properly taut start", "the solution to the mystery becomes apparent early on and that leaves the movie...tumbling rapidly into ever more unbelievable situations". Jeff Jarvis of People magazine called When the Bough Breaks "a nice, tight, tense little murder mystery" with "some neatly shocking scenes".

References

External links

1986 films
American mystery films
1980s thriller drama films
Films based on American novels
American thriller television films
American drama television films
NBC network original films
Films directed by Waris Hussein
Films scored by Paul Chihara
1986 drama films
1980s American films